Wang Xiaoping (born March 1964) is a Chinese politician who is the current Minister of Human Resources and Social Security, in office since 30 December 2022.

She is a representative of the 20th National Congress of the Chinese Communist Party and is a member of the Standing Committee of the 20th Central Commission for Discipline Inspection.

Early life and education
Wang was born in Tuanfeng County, Hubei, in March 1964. In 1981, she entered China University of Political Science and Law, where she majored in law.

Political career
Wang joined the Chinese Communist Party (CCP) in May 1988, upon graduation. After university in August 1988, she worked at Shougang Research and Development Corporation Law Institute.

Starting in September 1990, Wang served in several posts in the Policy Research Division of the Overseas Chinese Affairs Office of the State Council, including deputy division chief, division chief, deputy director, and director. She was director of the Foreign Division in October 2012 and subsequently deputy director of the Overseas Chinese Affairs Office in December 2015.

In March 2017, Wang was admitted to member of the Standing Committee of the CCP Jilin Provincial Committee, the province's top authority. He was head of the Publicity Department of the CCP Jilin Provincial Committee in April, in addition to serving as chairperson of Jilin Provincial Federation of Social Sciences since June. In May 2019, she became head of the Organization Department of the CCP Jilin Provincial Committee.

In October 2010, Wang was promoted to become deputy head of the Organization Department of the Chinese Communist Party, a position she held until December 2022. She is also a member of the Standing Committee of the Central Commission for Discipline Inspection (CCDI), the party's internal disciplinary body, and a member of the National Supervisory Commission, the highest anti-corruption agency of China.

On 30 December 2022, Wang was appointed Minister of Human Resources and Social Security, succeeding Zhou Zuyi.

References

1964 births
Living people
People from Huanggang
China University of Political Science and Law alumni
People's Republic of China politicians from Hubei
Chinese Communist Party politicians from Hubei
Women government ministers of China
20th-century Chinese women politicians
21st-century Chinese women politicians